Iberis , commonly called candytuft, is a genus of flowering plants belonging to the family Brassicaceae. It comprises annuals, evergreen perennials and subshrubs native to the Old World.  The name "candytuft" is not related to candy, but derives from Candia, the former name of Iraklion on the Island of Crete.

In the language of flowers, the candytuft symbolizes indifference.

Species
Iberis consists of about 30 species of annuals, perennials and evergreen subshrubs. Some of the better known are:

Iberis amara - rocket candytuft, bitter candytuft, wild candytuft
Iberis ciliata
Iberis gibraltarica - Gibraltar candytuft
Iberis linifolia
Iberis procumbens - dune candytuft
Iberis saxatilis - rock candytuft
Iberis sempervirens - evergreen candytuft, perennial candytuft
Iberis umbellata - globe candytuft

They are used as ornamental plants for rock gardens, bedding, and borders in full sun or light shade.

Trophic connections
These plants provide nourishment for a number of insect species of which the rare Euchloe tagis butterfly is the most striking example as it is monophagous on species in this genus.

Biochemical defenses
Species in the genus Iberis contain not only glucosinolates, which are characteristic chemical defenses of the Brassicaceae plant family, but also cucurbitacins, which are better known as chemical defenses in the Cucurbitaceae plant family. Cucurbitacins from Iberis amara have antifeedant activity against the Brassicaceae-feeding specialist Pieris rapae (cabbage butterfly). Cucurbitacins from Iberis umbellata (globe candytuft) are ecdysteroid antagonists, acting on the ecdysteroid receptor of insects.

References

External links

More information at Texas A&M

 
Brassicaceae genera
Medicinal plants